Barhi is a town,Tehsil and a Nagar Parishad in Katni district in the state of Madhya Pradesh, India.

Geography
It has an average elevation of 361 metres (1,184 feet).

Demographics

 India census, Barhi had a population of 13,946
Males constitute 53% of the population and females 47%. Barhi has an average literacy rate of 58%, lower than the national average of 59.5%; with 62% of the males and 38% of the females literate. 17% of the population is under 6 years of age.

Transport
By Bus

Barhi is served by five main road bus services daily two hours from the district headquarters.

By Rail

Khanna Banjari Railway Station

There is a Barhi to Katni bus service in every 75 minutes.

References

Tehsil in Katni
Cities and towns in Katni district
Katni